KBLJ (1400 AM) is a radio station licensed to La Junta, Colorado, United States. The station is owned by Robin Reed, through licensee Thunder Media, Inc, Inc.

History
It first aired on 1370 kHz as KOKO in 1937. It moved to 1400 kHz in 1941 as a result of the NARBA agreement.

On June 1, 2022, KBLJ changed their format from news/talk to classic hits, branded as "Lightning 1400".

Previous logo

References

External links
FCC History Cards for KBLJ

BLJ
Classic hits radio stations in the United States
Radio stations established in 1971